Rashid Mahmood (born 23 September 1971) is a Pakistani former cricketer. He played five first-class and eleven List A matches for several domestic teams in Pakistan between 1989 and 1992.

See also
 List of Pakistan Automobiles Corporation cricketers

References

External links
 

1971 births
Living people
Pakistani cricketers
Karachi Blues cricketers
Pakistan Automobiles Corporation cricketers
Pakistan National Shipping Corporation cricketers
Cricketers from Karachi